AeroFarms is a sustainable indoor agriculture company based in Newark, New Jersey and uses a patented aeroponic growing system to grow produce. The company currently owns and operates four farming facilities in and around Newark.

History 

AeroFarms began in 2004 in the Finger Lakes area of New York. In 2015, the company relocated its headquarters to Newark, New Jersey. The company was co-founded by CEO David Rosenberg, CMO Marc Oshima, and CSO (chief scientific officer) Edward Harwood.

In 2015, AeroFarms started a growing space in a 30,000 square-foot former paintball and laser tag arena in Newark.

In September 2016, the AeroFarms Global Headquarters opened in a 70,000 square-foot facility in Newark, which is the largest indoor vertical farm in the world based on annual growing capacity. The farm was built in a 75-year-old former steel mill facility and has the capacity to produce up to two million pounds of leafy greens per year.

AeroFarms also has a functioning farm in the dining hall of the Phillips Academy Charter School in Newark. This 50-square-foot farm opened in September 2011.

Product

AeroFarms uses aeroponic technology in their farms. Unlike hydroponics, aeroponics utilizes a closed loop system to mist the roots of the greens with nutrients, water, and oxygen. The growing cloth medium is made out of BPA-free, post-consumer recycled plastic. The cloth can be fully sanitized after harvest and then reseeded with no risk of contamination. Acting as a barrier between the mist and the plants, the cloth allows for a clean, dry and ready to eat product. LED lights are engineered to have specific spectrum, intensity, and frequency which controls the physical and flavor components of the produce. The controlled indoor environment disrupts the normal cycle of indoor pests. This pest resistant design does away with the need for pesticides, herbicides and fungicides.

Partnerships
AeroFarms leverages their technological platform as well as their data and knowledge of plant biology to create meaningful partnerships that will collaboratively solve some of today's biggest supply chain challenges. As part of ongoing efforts to build a more resilient and sustainable cocoa sector, Cargill and AeroFarms have entered into a multi-year research agreement aimed at improving cocoa bean yields and developing more climate-resilient farming practices.

Moreover, AeroFarms and Nokia Bell Labs have entered into a groundbreaking multi-year partnership to combine their expertise and expand their joint capabilities in cutting-edge networking, autonomous systems, and integrated machine vision and machine learning technologies to identify and track plant interactions at the most advanced levels. This combination of innovative technologies allows AeroFarms to reach the next level of imaging insights that further enhance its capabilities as an industry leading operator of world-class, fully-connected smart vertical farms that grow the highest quality plants all year round.

In September 2021, Goose Island UK and AeroFarms unveiled Hail Hydro - a brand new session IPA made from groundbreaking hydroponic hops grown indoors by AeroFarms. Skipping the soil, the hydro-cascade hops are submerged in a growing medium that supports and nourishes the roots of the plant with nutrient-rich water through AeroFarms’ indoor vertical farming technology platform. This method allows hops to be grown anywhere in the world, at any time of the year with consistent results, and to generate higher yields with fewer resources. With growing seasons and outdoor climate conditions in a major flux right now, hydroponic hops grown in AeroFarms indoor vertical farms for elevated resilience and flavor are undoubtedly the future, and a groundbreaking development in the beer world.

Farm Expansion
In June 2021, AeroFarms announced that AeroFarms AgX LTD, its wholly owned subsidiary in the United Arab Emirates (“AeroFarms AgX”), has started construction in Abu Dhabi on the company’s state-of-the art Research Center focused on the latest developments for indoor vertical farming, innovation, and AgTech.

In partnership with the Abu Dhabi Investment Office (ADIO), which is focused on enabling investment opportunities in Abu Dhabi, AeroFarms AgX will bring innovative research and development to the UAE and the Middle East to advance sustainable controlled environment agriculture (CEA) and vertical farming and help address broader global agriculture supply chain issues.

Additionally in August 2021, AeroFarms announced its plan to expand to the Midwest region as part of a project with World Wildlife Fund (WWF) and the St. Louis Controlled Environment Agriculture Coalition (STLCEA) to demonstrate innovative strategies to minimize the environmental footprint of indoor agriculture. The greater St. Louis MO-IL Metropolitan Statistical Area (MSA) was selected as a key market and innovation hub for indoor vertical farming and AgTech development.

Product Expansion
AeroFarms has been expanding its line of leafy greens at retail since 2019. Responding to consumer demand, AeroFarms continues to add new varieties to its core line of products. Produced year-round at the highest quality, AeroFarms microgreens offer great visual and flavor excitement, elevating the home cook into a chef. In addition, AeroFarms microgreens provide higher nutrient density than their mature green counterparts, offering a powerful way to provide a potent boost of vitamins, minerals, and phytonutrients. In July 2021, the company announced that it is expanding its line of leafy greens to include 5 new items: Baby Bok Choy-The New SpinachTM, Micro Arugula, Micro Broccoli, Micro Kale, and Micro Rainbow Mix.

Honors
AeroFarms was included in Fast Company's list of world's most innovative companies in 2018 in the food sector and in 2019 in the data science sector.

References 

Companies based in Newark, New Jersey
American companies established in 2004
Agriculture companies of the United States